This is a list of cockroaches of Saudi Arabia, including both indigenous and non-indigenous species.

Order Blattodea

Family Blattelidae
Blattella biligata
Blattella germanica German cockroach
Loboptera isolata
Supella longipalpa brown-banded cockroach
Supella orientalis
Supellina biquandi

Family Blattidae
Blatta orientalis Oriental cockroach
Periplaneta americana American cockroach
Shelfordella arabica
Shelfordella lateralis Turkestan cockroachFamily PolyphagidaeHeterogamisca chopardiPolyphaga aegyptiaca Egyptian desert cockroachHeterogamisca dispersaHeterogamisca marmorataSee also
 Blattodea Blattelidae Blattidae Polyphagidae''

References

.Saudi

cockroaches
Saudi Arabia
Cockroaches